Raysville is an unincorporated community in McDuffie County, in the U.S. state of Georgia. The community is on a peninsula jutting into Lake Strom Thurmond (Clarks Hill Lake) between Big Creek and Germany Creek arms of the lake. Georgia Route 43 passes through the community.

History
A post office called Raysville was established in 1894, and remained in operation until 1908. The community was named after Joseph Ray, a pioneer settler.

References

Unincorporated communities in McDuffie County, Georgia
Unincorporated communities in Georgia (U.S. state)